Lowell Liebermann (born February 22, 1961 in New York City) is an American composer, pianist and conductor.

Life and career
At the age of sixteen, Liebermann performed at Carnegie Hall, playing his Piano Sonata, op. 1. He studied at the Juilliard School of Music with David Diamond and Vincent Persichetti, earning bachelor's, master's and doctoral degrees. The English composer-pianist Kaikhosru Shapurji Sorabji also expressed interest in Liebermann's early work, having critiqued the young composer's Piano Sonata in a private exchange between the two; Liebermann's Concerto for Piano, op. 12 would be dedicated to Sorabji.

His most recorded works are his Sonata for Flute and Piano (1987), Gargoyles for piano (1989), and his Concerto for Flute and Orchestra (1992). Other notable works include a sonata for flute and guitar (1988), five cello sonatas (most recently 2019) the second piano concerto (1992), the opera The Picture of Dorian Gray (1996), a second symphony (2000), a trumpet concerto (2000), a violin concerto (2001), Rhapsody on a Theme of Paganini for piano and orchestra (2001), and the opera Miss Lonelyhearts (2006) which was commissioned as part of the festivities surrounding the centennial of the Juilliard School.  He was also commissioned by the Dranoff International Two Piano Foundation to compose "Three Lullabies" for two pianos.

Liebermann has also written the music for the ballet Frankenstein, a co-production between The Royal Ballet and San Francisco Ballet (2016).

His music combines elements of traditional tonality and structure with more adventurous harmonies. Liebermann's music is often highly polytonal and Liebermann explores different bitonal possibilities in many of his pieces. His Concerto for Piccolo and Orchestra, Concerto for Flute and Orchestra, and Concerto for Flute, Harp and Orchestra have been recorded by James Galway. American clarinetist Jon Manasse premiered his Concerto for Clarinet and Orchestra (2009) with The Dayton Philharmonic Orchestra conducted by Neal Gittleman.

Liebermann resides in New York City. He presently serves on the composition faculty at Mannes College The New School for Music and is the director of the Mannes American Composers Ensemble.

References

Sources 

 Cantrell, Scott (10 July 2005). On the Outside Looking In: Gay Composers Gave America Its Music. Dallas Morning News, reprinted in Andante.
 Time Magazine (30 November 1998). Music: James Galway Plays Lowell Liebermann. Accessed 16 February 2010.
 Time Magazine (6 March 2000). Music: Back to the Future. Accessed 16 February 2010.
 US Opera (undated). Lowell Liebermann. Accessed 14 August 2013.
 Roberge, Marc-André (2013). Opus sorabjianum: The Life and Works of Kaikhosru Shapurji Sorabji. Québec: self-published.

External links
 Lowell Liebermann website
 Lowell Liebermann's page at Theodore Presser Company
 Lowell Liebermann Interview, August 15, 1998
 Dayton Philharmonic's Classical Series Program Notes

1961 births
20th-century American composers
20th-century American male musicians
20th-century classical composers
20th-century American LGBT people
21st-century American composers
21st-century American male musicians
21st-century classical composers
21st-century American LGBT people
American classical composers
American male classical composers
Classical musicians from New York (state)
Composers for carillon
Composers from New York City
LGBT classical composers
American LGBT musicians
LGBT people from New York (state)
Living people
Musicians from New York City
Pupils of David Diamond (composer)
Pupils of Vincent Persichetti